Dan Cooper (also known as Les Aventures de Dan Cooper) is a Franco-Belgian comics series about a fictional Canadian military flying ace and rocketship pilot.

The comics series was conceived in 1954 as Tintin magazine's answer to the Buck Danny series published in the rival Spirou magazine.  It was written and drawn by the Belgian Albert Weinberg (1922–2011); however, a handful of the stories were written by Jean-Michel Charlier instead. As per the Franco-Belgian comics tradition, after being serialized in a weekly comic book magazine, each completed storyline would appear as a published album.

Synopsis
Dan Cooper is a test pilot in the Royal Canadian Air Force.  Early story-lines featured futuristic science-fiction themes such as piloting a rocketship to the Martian moon Deimos; however later stories were more rooted in present-day themes.

Speculative connection to D. B. Cooper

Although fairly obscure in the English-speaking world since it did not appear in English translation, the comics series nevertheless gained a small measure of notoriety in 2009 in the United States as a result of speculation concerning the identity of the 1971 airplane hijacker who came to be known as D. B. Cooper, but who had actually identified himself as "Dan Cooper." Cooper boarded a flight from Portland, Oregon to Seattle, Washington, claimed to have a bomb and demanded $200,000 in cash. He obtained the cash when the plane landed for refueling, and jumped from the Reno-bound airplane somewhere near Portland. Cooper was never apprehended or identified despite decades of FBI investigations, and the only evidence recovered outside the plane was a few thousand dollars in ransom cash buried or lost on a sandbar in the Columbia River. 

The Cooper Research Team led by Tom Kaye, working in cooperation with Seattle-based FBI agent Larry Carr, speculated that the hijacker may have chosen an alias based on the fictional character. Kaye and colleagues suggest the hijacker may have been exposed to the comics while on a tour of duty in Europe, or that he may have been of French-Canadian origin. Some of the comics storylines seemingly match aspects of the D. B. Cooper case, including jumping out of a plane with a parachute, as well as a ransom being delivered in a knapsack.

Albums

References

External links
 http://www.coolfrenchcomics.com/dancooper.htm
 http://francejohn.pagesperso-orange.fr/dc_page1.htm 
 http://www.ezzulia.nl/forum/viewtopic.php?f=188&t=13645

Belgian comic strips
Cooper, Dan
Aviation comics
Drama comics
Cooper, Dan
Cooper, Dan
Cooper, Dan
Cooper, Dan
1954 comics debuts
Cooper, Dan